Waldecker may refer to the Principality of Waldeck and Pyrmont or the Waldeck Plateau. It is also a German surname. Notable people with this name include:

 (born 1983), German footballer
Burkhart Waldecker (1902–1964), German explorer
 (born 1967), German historian
Rebecca Waldecker (born 1979), German mathematician